Gerlach I of Nassau (1271 – 7 January 1361), Count of Nassau in Wiesbaden, Idstein, Weilburg, and Weilnau.

He was a son of Adolf of Nassau, elected King of the Romans, and Imagina of Isenburg-Limburg.

Family and children 
He was married two times. First, 1307 with Agnes, a daughter of Agnes of Bavaria, Margravine of Brandenburg-Stendal and her first husband Henry the Younger of Hesse, and hence a granddaughter of Landgrave Henry I "the Child" of Hesse and had the following children:
 Adolph I, Count of Nassau-Wiesbaden-Idstein (1307 – 17 January 1370, Idstein).
 John I, Count of Nassau-Weilburg (1309 – 20 September 1371, Weilburg).
 Gerlach (1322 – 12 February 1371, Aschaffenburg), Archbishop of Mainz.
 Adelheid (d. 8 August 1344), married 1329 to Ulrich III, Lord of Hanau.
 Agnes, a nun at Klarenthal Abbey.
 Elisabeth (ca. 1326–ca. 1370), married before 16 August 1326 to Louis of Hohenlohe.
 Marie (d. 1366), married before 1336 to Konrad of Weinsberg.

Second, he married before 4 January 1337 , daughter of Kraft II of Hohenlohe-Weikersheim and had the following children:
 Kraft of Nassau-Sonnenberg (d. 1356), fell in the Battle of Poitiers.
 Rupert, Count of Nassau-Sonnenberg (d. 4 September 1390).

Literature 
 Pierre Even: Dynastie Luxemburg-Nassau. Von den Grafen zu Nassau zu den Großherzögen von Luxemburg. Eine neunhundertjährige Herrschergeschichte in einhundert Biographien . Luxemburg 2000, S. 20–22.
 Festschrift der Konrad-Duden-Schule in Wiesbaden-Sonnenberg 1904–1984.
 Festschrift 875 Jahre Sonnenberg. 1126-2001. Wiesbaden 2001.
 Gerhard Köbler: Historisches Lexikon der deutschen Länder. Die deutschen Territorien vom Mittelalter bis zur Gegenwart. 7., vollständig überarbeitete Auflage. C.H. Beck, München 2007, ISBN 978-3-406-54986-1.

External links 
 www.genealogie-mittelalter.de

13th-century births

Nassau, Gerlach I of
House of Nassau-Weilburg
Year of birth uncertain
Sons of kings